Russell Nelson (born March 21, 1958) is an American computer programmer. He was a founding board member of the Open Source Initiative and briefly served as its president in 2005.

Career
Nelson wrote code for some programs: In 1983, he co-wrote a MacPaint clone, Painter's Apprentice, with Patrick Naughton. Nelson was the author of Freemacs (a variant of Emacs used by FreeDOS). While attending university, Nelson began developing the collection of drivers later commercially released as the "Crynwr Collection". In 1991, Nelson founded Crynwr Software, a company located in Potsdam, New York, supporting deployment of large-scale e-mail systems, development of packet drivers, Linux kernel drivers, and reverse engineering of embedded systems.

In 1998, Nelson became one of the six first members to serve on the board of directors of the Open Source Initiative (holding 11 members by 2016). In February 2005, he became the president of the Open Source Initiative, but resigned a few days later (remaining on the board), on February 23, 2005, after publishing a controversial posting
on his personal blog titled "Blacks are Lazy?". Nelson apologized to those who perceived the post (which he withdrew because it "was not well written") as racist, and indicated that he did not believe himself to be politically savvy enough for the role of president. Six years later, in March 2011, he departed the board due to term limits on the position.

In July 2010, Nelson worked on monitors to measure water quality.

Personal
Nelson is the son of Russell Edward Nelson and Gladys Jacobsen Nelson. He used to be a Quaker, He has since disavowed the religion for political reasons. Nelson is a pacifist, and a member of the Libertarian Party of the United States.

References 

1958 births
Living people
American bloggers
American computer programmers
American libertarians
American male bloggers
American male writers
American political writers
Nelson, Russell
Former Quakers
Free software programmers
Members of the Open Source Initiative board of directors
21st-century American non-fiction writers